ORP Kaszub is a corvette of the Polish Navy, in service since 1987, the sole ship of the Project 620 class.  She was the first ocean-going warship built in Poland. As of 2012 she is in active service.

Construction and career
The work on her design began in 1971, but the construction of the first ship started only in 1984, being laid down at Stocznia Północna (Northern Shipyard), Gdańsk on 9 June 1984. Kaszub was launched on 11 May 1986, but was found to have a warped hull and propeller shafts, which required repair. When the ship was commissioned on 15 March 1987, Kaszub was not fitted with much of the planned armament, with a 9K33 Osa (NATO codename SA-N-4 Gecko) surface-to-air missile launcher being omitted because of its unreliability on small, high speed ships, while the ship's main gun armament was absent because of stability problems. Originally it was planned to build 7 ships of this class, but in the end only one was constructed.

At first, Kaszub saw little operational use, being loaned to the Polish Border guard from 1990 to January 1991. In September 1991, the ship was fitted with an AK-176  gun turret forward.

In October 2016 AM-35 Tryton, turret system with single 35mm Oerlikon gun was mounted, tested and officially certified  19 December 2018.

References

External links

Corvettes of the Polish Navy
1987 ships
Ships built in Gdańsk